This is a list of libraries in the island nation of Sri Lanka in South Asia.

National libraries
 National Museum Library
 National Library of Sri Lanka

legal deposit
Five copies of all publications which are published in Sri Lanka are to be sent to the Department of National Archives under the Printers and Publishers Ordinance. Four of these copies are sent each to;

 National Library and Documentation Centre
 National Museum Library
 University of Peradeniya library
 Library of the University of Ruhuna.

Science and technology libraries
This category created by using Ministry of Science and Technology institutions.
Arthur C. Clarke Institute for Modern Technologies (ACCCMT)
Atomic Energy Authority (AEA)
Industrial Technology Institute (ITI)
National Science & Technology Commission
National Engineering, Research and Development Centre (NERDC)
National Science Library & Resource Centre
Sri Lanka Planetarium

University libraries
University of Peradeniya library
Sri Jayewardenepura University Library
Colombo University Library
Kelaniya University Library
Moratuwa University Library
Open University Library
South Eastern University of Sri Lanka
Ruhuna University Library
Wayamba University Makandura Library
General Sir John Kotelawela Defence University Library
Eastern University, Sri Lanka Library
University of the Visual and Performing Arts Library
Sabaragamuwa University library

Institutional libraries
 International Water Management Institute (IWMI)
 International Water Management Institute (IWMI) Publications
 IWMI Library Catalog
Institute of Personal Management Library
 Evelyn Rutnam Institute for Inter-Cultural Studies
 Institute of Bankers of Sri Lanka Library (IBSL)

Public libraries

 Colombo Public Library, Colombo Municipal Council
Kumarathunga Munidasa Library, Matara Municipal Council
 Moratuwa Public Library, Moratuwa Municipal Council
 Kotte Public Library, Sri Jayawardenepura Kotte Municipal Council
 Dehiwala Central Library, Dehiwala-Mount Lavinia Municipal Council
 Negombo Public Library, Negombo Municipal Council
 Gampaha Public Library, Gampaha Municipal Council
 D.S. Senanayake Memorial Public Library, Kandy Municipal Council
 Nuwara Eliya Public Library, Nuwara Eliya Municipal Council
 Matale Public Library, Matale Municipal Council
 Dr. Richard Pathirana Public Library, Galle Municipal Council
 Galle Library
 Kumarathunga Munidasa Public Library, Dickwella Pradeshiya Sabha
 Ratnapura Public Library, Ratnapura Municipal Council
 Senarath Paranavithana Public Library, Municipal Council Badulla
 Anuradhapura Public Library, Anuradhapura Municipal Council
 Addalachenai Public Library, Addalachenai Pradeshiya Sabha
 Amir Ali Public Library, Sammanthurai Pradeshiya Sabha
 Kalmunai Public Library, Kalmunai Municipal Council
 Batticaloa Public Library, Batticaloa Municipal Council
 Jaffna Public Library, Jaffna Municipal Council
 Maharagama Public Library, Maharagama Urban Council
 Seethawakapura Public Library, Avissawella Urban Council
 Kalutara Public Library, Kalutara Urban Council
 Migettuwatte Gunananda Himi Memorial Public Library, Panadura Urban Council
 Horana Public Library, Horana Urban Council
 Katunayake Seeduwa Public Library, Katunayaka-Seeduwa Urban Council
 Peliyagoda Public Library, Peliyagoda Urban Council
 Ja-Ela Public Library, Ja-Ela Urban Council
 Gampola Public Library, Gampola Urban Council
 Nawalapitiya Public Library, Nawalapitiya Urban Council
 Hatton Public Library, Hatton Urban Council
 Ambalangoda Public Library, Ambalangoda Urban Council
 Hikkaduwa Public Library, Hikkaduwa Urban Council
 Weligama Public Library, Weligama Urban Council
 Hambantota Public Library, Hambantota Urban Council
 Tangalle Public Library, Tangalle Urban Council
 Balangoda Public Library, Balangoda Urban Council
 Kegalle Public Library, Kegalle Urban Council
 Haputale Public Library, Haputale Urban Council
 I. W. R. A. Eriyagolla Public Library, Kuliyapitiya Urban Council
 Kurunegala Public Library, Kurunegala Urban Council
 Puttalam Public Library, Puttalam Urban Council
 Halawatha Public Library, Halawatha Urban Council
 Ampara Public Library, Ampara Urban Council
 Trincomalee Public Library, Trincomalee Urban Council
 Mannar Public Library, Mannar Urban Council
 Katthankudi Public Library, Kattankudi Urban Council
 Chavakachcheri Public Library, Chavakacheri Urban Council
 Point Pedro Public Library, Point Pedro Urban Council
 Piliyandala Public Library, Kesbewa Pradeshiya Sabha
 Bandaranayaka Public Library, Homagama Pradeshiya Sabha
 Gnanapradeepa Public Library, Bandaragama Pradeshiya Sabha
 C. W. W. Kannangara Public Library, Mathugama Pradeshiya Sabha
 Pradeepa Central Library, Horana Pradeshiya Sabha
 Delgoda Public Library, Biyagama Pradeshiya Sabha
 Bandaranayaka Memorial Public Library, Minuwangoda Pradeshiya Sabha
 Demanhandiya Public Library, Katana Pradeshiya Sabha
 Dambulla Public Library, Dambulla Pradeshiya Sabha
 Baddegama Public Library, Baddegama Pradeshiya Sabha
 Kamburupitiya Public Library, Kamburupitiya Pradeshiya Sabha
 Beliatta Public Library, Beliatta Pradeshiya Sabha
 Ehaliyagoda Public Library, Ehaliyagoda Pradeshiya Sabha
 Embilipitiya Public Library, Embilipitiya Pradeshiya Sabha
 Yatiyanthota Public Library, Yatityanthota Pradeshiya Sabha
 Mawanella Public Library, Mawanella Pradeshiya Sabha
 Ruwanwella Central Library, Kahatagasthenna Pradeshiya Sabha
 Rambukkana Public Library, Rambukkana Pradeshiya Sabha
 Bandarawela Public Library, Bandarawela Pradeshiya Sabha
 Monaragala Public Library, Monaragala Pradeshiya Sabha
 Buththala Public Library, Buththala Pradeshiya Sabha
 Hettipola Public Library, Panduwasnuwara Pradeshiya Sabha
 Gnanapradeepa Public Library, Pannala Pradeshiya Sabha
 Mawatagama Public Library, Mawatagama Pradeshiya Sabha
 Wennappuwa Public Library, Wennappuwa Pradeshiya Sabha
 Polonnaruwa Public Library, Thamankaduwa Pradeshiya Sabha
 Bandaranayaka Public Library, Hingurakgoda Pradeshiya Sabha
 Kekirawa Public Library, Kekirawa Pradeshiya Sabha
 Kilinochchi Public Library, Karachchi Pradeshiya Sabha
 Uduvil Public Library, Valikamam South Divisional Council
 Nattandiya Public Library, Nattandiya Public Library
 Malimbada Public Library, Malimbada Pradeshiya Sabha

School libraries
Wajra Jayanthi Library-Rahula College, Matara
Ananda College, Colombo
Dharmaraja College, Kandy
 Frank Lee Woodward Library, Mahinda College, Galle
Mahanama College, Colombo
Royal College, Colombo
St Peter's College, Colombo
St. Sebastian's College, Moratuwa
S. Thomas' College, Mt Lavinia
Taxila Central College, Horana
presidents College, maharagama

 Ku/Nungamuwa mahavidyalaya, Yatigaloluwa, Polgahawela
Ku/Rathmalgoda Maha Vidyalaya, Polgahawela

Important library related institutions

Local
National Library and Documentation Services Board
Sri Lanka Library Association-SLLA

Foreign
The International Federation of Library Associations and Institutions-IFLA

References

External links
 Main Public Libraries in Sri Lanka

 
Libraries
Lib
Sri Lanka